Anton McKenzie (January 4, 1981) is an American former player of Canadian football and American football. He played for three seasons for the Saskatchewan Roughriders before playing for five seasons for the BC Lions of the CFL. He played college football at Massachusetts.

External links
Ottawa Redblacks bio 
Massachusetts Minutemen bio

1981 births
Living people
BC Lions players
Canadian football linebackers
American football linebackers
American players of Canadian football
Ottawa Redblacks players
People from Stony Brook, New York
Players of American football from New York (state)
Saskatchewan Roughriders players
Sportspeople from Suffolk County, New York
UMass Minutemen football players